The state football associations are the regional governing bodies of football in India. There are 37 state associations affiliated to the All India Football Federation.

The state associations have their own constitution and structure. Depending on the size of the state, some associations have sub-district associations that are affiliated to them. Each state conducts its own competitions, while the local sub-associations organise lower tier leagues.

Members

Full members

Affiliate members

See also
 List of members of the Board of Control for Cricket in India

References

External links
 The AIFF official website (archived)

state football associations
Football governing bodies in India